Callum Smith (born 13 November 1999) is a Scottish footballer who plays as a forward for Airdrieonians. Smith has previously played for Alloa Athletic, Arbroath, Hamilton Academical and  Dunfermline Athletic.

Career
Smith was educated at Beath High School and began his career with Cowdenbeath's youth squad, before moving to Dunfermline Athletic, nicknamed the Pars, to join the Under 15s side. Smith then continued his development with the Fife Elite Football Academy, after the amalgamation of Fife's football clubs' youth sides into one academy. In 2016, Smith returned to the Pars, signing a one-year contract with the club to play for the side's development squad. His first appearance for the first-team came in the Scottish League Cup, where he came on as a 78th-minute substitute for Michael Moffat in the 5–1 loss to Inverness Caledonian Thistle at East End Park. Smith impressed with his performances for the youth side, becoming the club's top scorer in the SPFL Development League, which resulted in him making his first league appearance against Greenock Morton. Smith replaced Nicky Clark in the 82nd minute, and made an immediate impact, setting up Rhys McCabe, assisting in Dunfermline's third goal.

With the club deciding not to participate in the 2017–18 SPFL Development League, Smith was promoted to the first team for the 2017–18 season. He played in all four Scottish League Cup group stage matches, scoring his first goal for the Pars in a 6–0 win against Elgin City. His full debut came in the final match of the group stage against Hearts at Tynecastle. With main striker Nicky Clark injured, Smith started alongside Declan McManus, who he provided an assist for to put the Pars 2–1 ahead. Smith joined Scottish League One club Alloa Athletic on loan at the end of January 2018, helping the side to a third place finish and victory in the Championship play-offs over Dumbarton.

In August 2018, Smith joined League One club Arbroath on a season long loan; despite being sidelined for two months with an injury, he made nine appearances before his loan was cut short in January 2019. At the beginning of the 2019–20 season, Smith moved on a season-long loan to Airdrieonians as part of a deal that saw Josh Edwards sign for Dunfermline.

Smith left Dunfermline after the curtailed 2019–20 season, and signed a two-year contract with Hamilton Academical in June 2020. He scored his first goal for Hamilton in a 3–0 win over Motherwell on 2 January 2021.
He joined Airdrieonians on 5th August 2021

Personal life
Smith's brother, Connor, is also a footballer.

Career statistics

References

External links
UEFA profile at UEFA

1999 births
Living people
People from Cowdenbeath
People educated at Beath High School
Scottish footballers
Association football forwards
Scottish Football League players
Dunfermline Athletic F.C. players
Alloa Athletic F.C. players
Arbroath F.C. players
Airdrieonians F.C. players
Hamilton Academical F.C. players
Scottish Professional Football League players
Scotland youth international footballers
Footballers from Fife